Team Leader Motorsports was a racing team owned by R. Kent Baker  in the Indy Racing League IndyCar Series that participated in the 2006 Indianapolis 500 and entered the 2007 race. Team Leader participated in the 2006 race in partnership with CURB/Agajanian/Beck Motorsports. In 2007 the two teams became separate entities. Their 2007 entry was modeled to appear similar to driver P. J. Jones' father Parnelli Jones' STP-Paxton Turbocar that he drove in the 1967 race. Jones and the team were unable to find enough speed to qualify for the 2007 race. The team did not make an appearance in 2008.

Baker previously owned R. Kent Baker Racing which was active from 1988 to 1991.

Past drivers

R. Kent Baker Racing
 Phil Krueger (1988)
 John Paul Jr. (1989)
 Steve Chassey (1989)
 Stan Fox (1990)
 Dean Hall (1991)

Team Leader Motorsports
 Stephan Gregoire (2006)
 P. J. Jones (2006)
 R. Kent Baker (2008–2009 SCCA/DSR)
 R. Kent Baker (2012–2016 SVRA/GTP3)

Complete IRL IndyCar Series results
(key) (Results in bold indicate pole position; results in italics indicate fastest lap)

 In conjunction with Curb-Agajanian-Beck Motorsports.

IndyCar Series teams
American auto racing teams